Eva Alina Hočevar (born 27 March 2002) is a Slovenian slalom canoeist who has competed at the international level since 2017.

She won a silver medal in the K1 team event at the 2022 World Championships in Augsburg. She also won a silver medal in the C1 team event at the 2020 European Championships in Prague.

References

External links

Living people
Slovenian female canoeists
2002 births
Medalists at the ICF Canoe Slalom World Championships